Old Cleveland Road is a major road in Brisbane, Queensland. It runs  from Stones Corner to Capalaba in Brisbane, with most of the route signed as State Route 22. Sections of the road are also part of State Routes 30, 54, and 55.  The road is the main route from inner Brisbane to Capalaba and Cleveland since New Cleveland Road only links Tingalpa with Capalaba.

The road provides the quickest access to the suburbs of Capalaba and Carindale from Logan Road and the Gateway Motorway, as well as being a main access road for Westfield Carindale Shopping Centre and Capalaba Central Shopping Centre. When completed the Eastern Busway will run parallel to, and (in some parts) in the middle of, the road so bus patrons can avoid severe peak hour traffic congestion road-wide.

History
In 1839 and 1841 surveyors James Warner, Granville Stayplton and Robert Dixon were directed by incoming Lieutenant Owen Gorman to prepare the Moreton Bay Penal Colony for civil administration and private (rather than convict only) occupation. A subsequent 1841 survey proposed a slightly different alignment, crossing over Tingalpa Creek only once.

In 1849, Major Thomas Mitchell, Surveyor-General of the Colony of New South Wales directed that a town at Cleveland Point be surveyed as per Warner's suggestion in the 1841 survey. Warner submitted his Survey  of a practicable road from Brisbane in the County of Stanley to the proposed Town of Cleveland in the same County on 22 May 1850, the first definitive plan and (subsequent) construction of a road on the current's approximate alignment. The first sale of blocks of land at Cleveland occurred on 13 August 1851 after Warner submitted a survey of allotments for the new town on 25 April of that same year.

Old Cleveland Road's alignment was variously altered by various surveyors, including Warner and Gould, and the New South Wales and (subsequent) Queensland colonial and State governments until 1961, the route of which remains largely unchanged to this day. Oddly, a 1926 Brisbane City Council map called the road Cleveland Road whilst today's Mt. Gravatt-Capalaba Road was labelled by council as Old Cleveland Road. A 1975 Brisbane City Council proposal to rename the current Old Cleveland Road was halted after the Redland City council objected to the change.

Between 1912 and 1926, part of the Belmont Tramway ran along the road at Carina. Between 1948 and 1969, Brisbane City Council electric trams ran along Old Cleveland Road between Logan Road and Belmont. Approximately  of tram track remains in the median strip between Jones Road to Orwell Street in Carina. This remaining tram track is listed on the Queensland Heritage Register.

Landmarks
 Eastern Busway
 Westfield Carindale Shopping Centre
 Sleeman Centre
 Gateway Motorway
 Capalaba Central Shopping Centre
 Coorparoo State School and the Queen Alexandra Home Community Centre
 Camp Hill State Primary School
 Belmont State Primary School

Upgrades

Intersection upgrade planning
A project to plan the upgrade of the intersection with Tilley Road, at a cost of $600,000, is expected to complete by late 2022.

Safety improvements
A project to provide safety improvements at three intersections, at a cost of $501,000, was to begin construction early in 2022.

Gateway on-ramp upgrade
A project to upgrade the Gateway on-ramp, at a cost of $5 million, was to be completed late in 2021.

Major intersections
The entire road is in the Brisbane local government area.

See also

 Ipswich Road
 Logan Road
 Road transport in Brisbane

References

 
Roads in Brisbane
Roads in Redland City
Capalaba, Queensland